George Hampel may refer to:

George Hampel (judge), Australian barrister and judge
George Hampel (legislator) (1885–1954), Milwaukee bookseller and legislator